Aferim! is a 2015 Romanian drama film directed by Radu Jude and produced by Ada Solomon. It was screened in the main competition section of the 65th Berlin International Film Festival where Radu Jude won the Silver Bear for Best Director. It was selected as the Romanian entry for the Best Foreign Language Film at the 88th Academy Awards.

Plot
The film is set in Wallachia in the early 19th century, when a local policeman, Costandin played by Teodor Corban, is hired by Iordache, a boyar, to find Carfin played by Toma Cuzin, a Gypsy slave who had run away from the boyar's estate after having an affair with his wife, Sultana.

Cast
Victor Rebengiuc as Stan
Luminița Gheorghiu as Smaranda Cîndescu
Șerban Pavlu as Traveler
Toma Cuzin as Carfin Pandolean
Gabriel Spahiu as Vasile
Mihaela Sîrbu as Sultana
Alexandru Bindea as Priest on the road
Teodor Corban as Costandin

Reception
On review aggregator website Rotten Tomatoes the film has an approval rating of 98% based on 76 critics, with an average rating of 7.9/10. The site's critics consensus reads: "Smart, visually arresting, and scathingly funny, Aferim! depicts a world that many American filmgoers have never seen -- but will still, in many respects, find utterly familiar". On Metacritic, the film have an above average score of 84 out of 100 based on 17 critics, indicating "universal acclaim".

Publication The Hollywood Reporter describes Radu Jude's film as "a harsh lesson of history, relieved by overlooked humor and classic Western elements". Variety magazine writes that Aferim! is "an exceptional and extremely intelligent insight into a crucial period of history, a film equally inspired and furious".

According to Jordan Hoffman of The Guardian, "this [film] with all its full-frontal historical horror, is still loaded with laughs".

A.O. Scott of The New York Times called Aferim! "brilliant" and "sublime", while Kit Gillet of the same periodical went as far as calling it "an Oscar contender".

See also
List of submissions to the 88th Academy Awards for Best Foreign Language Film
List of Romanian submissions for the Academy Award for Best Foreign Language Film
List of films featuring slavery

References

External links

2015 films
2015 Western (genre) films
Romanian drama films
2010s Romanian-language films
Films about slavery
Films directed by Radu Jude
Films set in the Ottoman Empire
Films about Romani people
Films set in the 19th century
Bulgarian drama films
Czech Western (genre) films
French Western (genre) films
2010s French films
Foreign films set in the United States